Andy Murray was the defending champion, but chose not to participate that year.
Jo-Wilfried Tsonga won in the final 7–5, 7–6(7–3), against Michaël Llodra.

Seeds

Draw

Finals

Top half

Bottom half

Qualifying

Seeds

Qualifiers

Lucky loser

Draw

First qualifier

Second qualifier

Third qualifier

Fourth qualifier

External links
Main Draw
Qualifying Draw

Singles